Alpha Andromedae (α Andromedae, abbreviated Alpha And or α And), officially named Alpheratz , is 97 light-years from the Sun and is the brightest star in the constellation of Andromeda when Beta Andromedae undergoes its periodical dimming. Immediately northeast of the constellation of Pegasus, it is the upper left star of the Great Square of Pegasus.

Although it appears to the naked eye as a single star, with overall apparent visual magnitude +2.06, it is actually a binary system composed of two stars in close orbit. The chemical composition of the brighter of the two stars is unusual as it is a mercury-manganese star whose atmosphere contains abnormally high levels of mercury, manganese, and other elements, including gallium and xenon. It is the brightest mercury-manganese star known.

Nomenclature 

α Andromedae (Latinised to Alpha Andromedae) is the star's Bayer designation. Ptolemy considered the star (system) to be shared by Pegasus and Johann Bayer assigned it a designation in both constellations: Alpha Andromedae (α And) and Delta Pegasi (δ Peg).  Since the IAU standardized constellation boundaries and widely published them two years after in 1930, the Pegasi alternate name has dropped from use, putting it slightly outside of that constellation.

To most European centres of learning the star bore names Alpheratz or the cognate simplification Alpherat or the other part of the fabled description: Sirrah . 

The origin of these three, the Arabic phrasal name, is سرة الفرس  "navel of the mare/horse", attracting a hard consonant not present above due to a following vowel. The horse corresponds equivalently to the winged horse of the Greeks, Pegasus. The star is in almost all depictions part of the main asterism of Pegasus and Andromeda. In 2016, the International Astronomical Union organized a Working Group on Star Names (WGSN) to catalog and standardize proper names for stars. The WGSN's first bulletin of July 2016 confirmed Alpheratz as the name for the main star.

Other terms for this star used by some medieval astronomers writing were راس المراة المسلسلة rās al-mar'a al-musalsala (head of the woman in chains), al-kaff al-khaḍīb and kaff al-naṣīr (palm of the faithful). The chained woman referenced Andromeda. 

In the Hindu lunar zodiac, this star, together with the other stars in the Great Square of Pegasus (α, β, and γ Pegasi), makes up the nakshatras of Pūrva Bhādrapadā and Uttara Bhādrapadā.

It is also known as one of the "Three Guides" that mark the prime meridian of the heavens, the other two being Beta Cassiopeiae and Gamma Pegasi. It was believed to bless those born under its influence with honour and riches.

System

The radial velocity of a star away from or towards the observer can be determined by measuring the red shift or blue shift of its spectrum. The American astronomer Vesto Slipher made a series of such measurements from 1902 to 1904 and discovered that the radial velocity of α Andromedae varied periodically. He concluded that it was in orbit in a spectroscopic binary star system with a period of about 100 days. A preliminary orbit was published by Hans Ludendorff in 1907, and a more precise orbit was later published by Robert Horace Baker.

The fainter star in the system was first resolved interferometrically by Xiaopei Pan and his coworkers during 1988 and 1989, using the Mark III Stellar Interferometer at the Mount Wilson Observatory, California, United States. This work was published in 1992. Because of the difference in luminosity between the two stars, its spectral lines were not observed until the early 1990s, in observations made by Jocelyn Tomkin, Xiaopei Pan, and James K. McCarthy between 1991 and 1994 and published in 1995.

The two stars are now known to orbit each other with a period of 96.7 days. The larger, brighter star, called the primary, has a spectral type of B8IVpMnHg, a mass of approximately 3.6 solar masses, a surface temperature of about 13,800 K, and, measured over all wavelengths, a luminosity of about 200 times the Sun's. Its smaller, fainter companion, the secondary, has a mass of approximately 1.8 solar masses and a surface temperature of about 8,500 K, and, again measured over all wavelengths, a luminosity of about 10 times the Sun's. It is an early-type A star whose spectral type has been estimated as A3V.

Chemical peculiarities
In 1906, Norman Lockyer and F. E. Baxandall reported that α Andromedae had a number of unusual lines in its spectrum. In 1914, Baxandall pointed out that most of the unusual lines came from manganese, and that similar lines were present in the spectrum of μ Leporis. In 1931, W. W. Morgan identified 12 additional stars with lines from manganese appearing in their spectra. Many of these stars were subsequently identified as part of the group of mercury-manganese stars, a class of chemically peculiar stars which have an excess of elements such as mercury, manganese, phosphorus, and gallium in their atmospheres., §3.4. In the case of α Andromedae, the brighter primary star is a mercury-manganese star which, as well as the elements already mentioned, has excess xenon.

In 1970, Georges Michaud suggested that such chemically peculiar stars arose from radiative diffusion. According to this theory, in stars with unusually calm atmospheres, some elements sink under the force of gravity, while others are pushed to the surface by radiation pressure., §4. This theory has successfully explained many observed chemical peculiarities, including those of mercury-manganese stars., §4.

Variability of primary
α Andromedae has been reported to be slightly variable, but observations from 1990 to 1994 found its brightness to be constant to within less than 0.01 magnitude. However, Adelman and his co-workers have discovered, in observations made between 1993 and 1999 and published in 2002, that the mercury line in its spectrum at 398.4 nm varies as the primary rotates. This is because the distribution of mercury in its atmosphere is not uniform. Applying Doppler imaging to the observations allowed Adelman et al. to find that it was concentrated in clouds near the equator. Subsequent Doppler imaging studies, published in 2007, showed that these clouds drift slowly over the star's surface.

Observation

The location of α Andromedae in the sky is shown on the left. It can be seen by the naked eye and is theoretically visible at all latitudes north of 60° S. During evening from August to October, it will be high in the sky as seen from the northern midlatitudes.

Optical companion

The binary system described above has an optical visual companion, discovered by William Herschel on July 21, 1781. Designated as ADS 94 B in the Aitken Double Star Catalogue, it is a G-type star with an apparent visual magnitude of approximately 10.8. Although by coincidence it appears near to the other two stars in the sky, it's much more distant from Earth; the parallax observed by Gaia place this star more than 1,300 light years away.

Notes and references

External links

Andromeda (constellation)
Andromedae, Alpha
Andromedae, 21
B-type subgiants
Alpheratz
Spectroscopic binaries
000358
000677
G-type stars
A-type main-sequence stars
Triple stars 
BD+28 0004
Astronomical objects known since antiquity
0015
Mercury-manganese stars
TIC objects